Happy Anniversary is a 2018 American romance comedy film, written and directed by Jared Stern in his directorial debut. It stars Noël Wells, Ben Schwartz, Jeff Grace, Rahul Kohli, Kristin Bauer van Straten, Kate Berlant, Leonardo Nam, David Walton, Isidora Goreshter, Annie Potts and Joe Pantoliano. This is a story about a mini crisis that a couple has on the day of their third anniversary being together.

The film was released on March 30, 2018, by Netflix.

Cast
 Noël Wells as Mollie
 Ben Schwartz as Sam
 Rahul Kohli as Ed
 Kristin Bauer van Straten as Willa
 Kate Berlant as Lindsay
 Leonardo Nam as Hao
 David Walton as Arik
 Isidora Goreshter as Georgia
 Annie Potts as Diane
 Joe Pantoliano as Aldo
 Sanchita Malik as Priya
 Molly Schreiber as Sheera Weinberg

Production
In January 2017, it was announced Noël Wells, Ben Schwartz, Annie Potts, and Joe Pantoliano joined the cast of the film, with Jared Stern directing from a screenplay he wrote. Marc Provissiero, Helena Heyman, M. Elizabeth Hughes will produce the film under their Odenkirk Provissiero Entertainment and Industry Entertainment banners, respectively. In February 2017, Rahul Kohli joined the cast of the film. Joshua Moshier composed the film's score.

Production began on January 31, 2017, in Los Angeles, California.

Release
The film was released on March 30, 2018.

Reception

References

External links
 

2018 films
American romantic comedy films
2018 romantic comedy films
2018 directorial debut films
English-language Netflix original films
Films directed by Jared Stern
Films shot in Los Angeles
Films with screenplays by Jared Stern
2010s English-language films
2010s American films